Nemanja Trajković (born 13 June 1991) is a Serbian football defender.

Honours
Napredak Kruševac
Serbian First League: 2015–16

References

External links
 
 

1991 births
Living people
Footballers from Belgrade
Association football defenders
Serbian footballers
Serbian expatriate footballers
FK Sloga Kraljevo players
FK FAP players
FK BASK players
FK Radnički Nova Pazova players
FK Napredak Kruševac players
OFK Bačka players
OFK Beograd players
ASC Oțelul Galați players
FK Smederevo players
FK Trayal Kruševac players
FK Novi Pazar players
Serbian First League players
Serbian SuperLiga players
Serbian expatriate sportspeople in Romania
Expatriate footballers in Romania